Monwabisi Patrick Matolengwe (12 May 1937 - 31 May 2019) was a South African Anglican bishop.

Matolengwe was born in Graaff-Reinet in the Eastern Cape. He qualified as a teacher at the Teachers’ College at Lovedale, he  taught  for a few years, after which he worked as a court interpreter in Laaiplek in the Western Cape. While at Laaiplek he became involved in Christian youth education and  decided to change his career and trained for the Anglican ministry.

After graduation in 1966, he worked at Nyanga, Cape Town and in the surrounding rural areas. In  recognition of his ministry he was made a canon of St. George's Cathedral, Cape Town, he was subsequently elected  to be a suffragan bishop of the diocese of Cape Town.

The political and social pressures of life in the Apartheid-era South Africa in the  1970s and 80s took their toll on his health. In 1988, he was invited by the bishop of Milwaukee to move to the United States. He was appointed dean of All Saints Cathedral, Milwaukee and assisting bishop in the diocese of Milwaukee. He studied theology at Nashotah House and at the United Theological Seminary, Dayton, Ohio, where he received a master's degree in  Theological Studies degree and doctoral degree in ministry. In recognition of his work in the diocese, Nashotah House conferred on him an honorary Doctor of Divinity degree.

He returned to South Africa in 1998 and worked with the South African Council of Churches. In retirement, he worked in the Anglican parish in Graaff-Reinet in the Diocese of George. In 2011 the bishop of Kimberley and Kuruman invited him to be an assisting bishop in the western part of that diocese. On completion of that assignment he returned to Johannesburg to assist at the parish of Christ the King in Sophiatown.

Matolengwe died on 31 May 2019 in the Helen Joseph Hospital, Johannesburg.

References

External links
SA History Online Robert Sobukwe
 All Saints' Belhar

1937 births
2019 deaths
21st-century Anglican Church of Southern Africa bishops
Anglican suffragan bishops in South Africa